King of Fighters R-2 is a fighting game released by SNK in 1999 for the Neo-Geo Pocket Color handheld system, part of The King of Fighters series. It is the sequel to King of Fighters R-1 for the Neo-Geo Pocket, the previous generation of the handheld. A port for Nintendo Switch was released on August 7, 2020.

Like most other King of Fighters games, King of Fighters R-2 features various SNK characters. This game, based on The King of Fighters '98, has the main character going up against Rugal Bernstein as Rugal is creating clones of the main characters.

Plot
The game shares the same story as The King of Fighters '98.

Gameplay
King of Fighters R-2 brings back most of King of Fighters R-1s gameplay, bringing back Singleplay and Teamplay, and the VS mode using a link cable. The Making mode is a new mode which lets the player customize their fighter and send them on a quest to defeat Rugal Bernstein. Also the player can connect with the Dreamcast game King of Fighters '99 Dream Match. It has all the starting characters from King of Fighters R-1 except Chizuru Kagura and Kim Kaphwan, replacing them with Saisyu Kusanagi and Kasumi Todoh.

Characters

Starting characters
1.Team Kusanagi:
Kyo Kusanagi
Saisyu Kusanagi
Shingo Yabuki

2.Team Psycho:
Athena Asamiya
Yuri Sakazaki
Kasumi Todoh

3.Team Fatal Fury:
Terry Bogard
Ryo Sakazaki
Mai Shiranui

4.Team Orochi:
Yashiro Nanakase
Shermie
Chris

5.Edit Member''':
Leona Heidern
Iori Yagami

Unlockable characters
Classic Ryo
Classic Kyo
Classic Terry
Orochi Yashiro
Orochi Shermie
Orochi Chris
Classic Mai
Omega Rugal
Classic Yuri
Orochi Iori   
Orochi Leona

 Reception King of Fighters R-2 on Nintendo Switch received "mixed or average reviews" according to review aggregator Metacritic.

In 2023, Time Extension identified King of Fighters R-2'' as one of the best games for the NGPC.

References

External links

1999 video games
2D fighting games
Neo Geo Pocket Color games
Nintendo Switch games
The King of Fighters games
Video games developed in Japan
Video games scored by Takushi Hiyamuta
Video game sequels